Over End may refer to:
Over End, Cambridgeshire
Over End, Derbyshire